Dvorište is a village in the municipality of Šabac, Serbia. According to the 2002 census, the village has a population of 282 people.

References

Populated places in Mačva District